Stuart Robertson (1944 – September 23, 2009) was a professional gardener from Montreal, Quebec, Canada. He was born in Bournemouth, England. Since 1981, he had been the gardening columnist for the Montreal Gazette and has been a part of the radio show Radio Noon on CBC Radio One. He has published a series of gardening guide books titled Stuart Robertson's Tips on Organic Gardening.

Robertson died from complications of pneumonia at St. Mary's Hospital on September 23, 2009.

References

1944 births
2009 deaths
Deaths from pneumonia in Quebec
Canadian gardeners
Organic gardeners
People from Bournemouth
People from Montreal